Hanna Rucker (1923–1982) was a German stage and film actress.

Selected filmography
 Heart of Stone (1950)
 Under the Thousand Lanterns (1952)
 I'm Waiting for You (1952)
 Under the Stars of Capri (1953)
 The Confession of Ina Kahr (1954)
 The First Kiss (1954)
 San Salvatore (1956)

References

Bibliography 
 Goble, Alan. The Complete Index to Literary Sources in Film. Walter de Gruyter, 1999.

External links 
 

1923 births
1982 deaths
German stage actresses
German film actresses
Actresses from Munich
German expatriates in the United Kingdom